Cedar Township is a township in Lee County, Iowa.

History
Cedar Township was organized in 1844.

References

Townships in Lee County, Iowa
Townships in Iowa